Tamil Nadu Arasu Cable TV Corporation Limited (TNACTCL) is a state-government Public Sector Undertaking of Government of Tamil Nadu located in the Indian state of Tamil Nadu. TNACTCL is a cable television operator across the state.

Achievements

TACTV Operation

Arasu Cable TV Corporation was incorporated on 04.10.2007 with the objective of providing high quality cable TV signals to the public at an affordable cost. In order to achieve this objective, 4 Digital Head Ends were installed at Thanjavur, Tirunelveli, Coimbatore and Vellore.
 
After assuming office in May 2011, the Chief Minister of Tamil Nadu revived the Arasu Cable TV Corporation which had become defunct due to various reasons and sanctioned a sum of 3 Crores for the revival and expansion of the activities of the Corporation. The Corporation was renamed as Tamil Nadu Arasu Cable TV Corporation Limited (TACTV).
 
TACTV has taken on lease the Head Ends of the willing private Multi System Operators in 27 Districts of the State and revamped its existing four digital Head Ends in 4 Districts.
 
On 30.08.2011, the Chief Minister of Tamil Nadu had announced on the floor of the Assembly that TACTV would provide quality services at an affordable cost of 180 as monthly subscription to the subscribers through the cable TV would collect 20 per month per subscriber from the Cable Operators.
 
The Chief Minister of Tamil Nadu launched the cable TV services all over Tamil Nadu (except Chennai) on 02.09.2011 by switching-on the Head End at Vellore through Video Conferencing. On 20.10.2012, the Chief Minister inaugurated the Cable TV Services of TACTV in Chennai Metro.
 
TACTV is providing quality Cable TV Services at an affordable cost of 180 per month with 90-100 channels and the response from the cable operators and the public were overwhelming. It is evident from the fact that the subscribers base of TACTV which was 4.94 lakhs on 02.09.2011 has risen to 62.17 lakhs on 01.09.2013 with an operator base of 24619. 
 
At present TACTV is providing the Cable TV services with 99-100 Channels, including Free-to-Air Channels, Pay Channels and Private Local Channels. The corporation has procured 137 pay Channels and almost all the Pay channels are in the bouquet of the Corporation.
 
Before TACTV’s existence, the cable TV sector was unorganized and a few Multi System Operators had created monopoly and thereby forced the local Cable TV operators as well as the public to pay exorbitant amount towards cable TV services. Earlier, the public were paying 150 to 250 per month to the private Cable TV companies to avail the cable TV service.
 
The service being provided by TACTV is welfare step taken by the Government, in the interest of the public and cable TV operators. Now TACTV is providing the Cable TV services with most of the pay channels, at an affordable cost of 120 per month, to the public through cable operators and the public could save a sum of 80 to 180 per month. Therefore, the public have overwhelmingly welcomed TACTV’s cable TV services.
 
TACTV has selected 1200 private local channels and issued allotment orders, out of which approximately 800 are running through TACTV.

References

External links 
  www.tactv.in [TNACTCL Official Website]

Cable television companies of India
Companies based in Chennai
Government-owned companies of India
Mass media companies established in 2007
2007 establishments in Tamil Nadu
Indian companies established in 2007